The Eastern Waiotauru River, also known as the Snowy River is a river of New Zealand. It joins with the Southern Waiotauru River to become the Waiotauru River, a tributary of the Ōtaki River.

See also
List of rivers of New Zealand

References

Land Information New Zealand - Search for Place Names

Rivers of the Wellington Region
Rivers of New Zealand